Lieutenant Commander George Herbert Goodman,  (25 November 1900 – 31 May 1945) of the Royal Navy Volunteer Reserve was awarded the George Cross for the "great gallantry and undaunted devotion to duty" he showed on 15 January 1942 in defusing an Italian circling torpedo.

Naval career
Goodman was attached to HMS Vernon, HMS President and HMS Nile (Alexandria) and rendered many unexploded devices safe during the war in Britain and North Africa.

George Cross
Goodman was the first person to defuse the Italian self-destructing torpedo which had beached itself east of Alexandria. He was assisted in this action by Petty Officer William Filer and painter Archibald John Russell, both of whom received the George Medal.

Notice of Goodman's George Cross appeared in the London Gazette on 15 September 1942, reading:

Death
Goodman died when a booby-trap exploded in a house in Rotterdam, on 31 May 1945.

References

Military personnel from Worcestershire
British recipients of the George Cross
Royal Navy recipients of the George Cross
Royal Naval Volunteer Reserve personnel of World War II
Royal Navy officers of World War II
Royal Navy personnel killed in World War II
Members of the Order of the British Empire
Bomb disposal personnel
1900 births
1945 deaths
People from Bromsgrove